Reginald Dwayne Slater (born August 27, 1970) is an American former professional basketball player born in Houston, Texas. He played the power forward position and played college basketball at the University of Wyoming. His son Rashawn Slater was a first round draft choice by the Los Angeles Chargers. Reggie married Katie Slater. Reggie has four kids, Aliyah Slater, Reginald Slater Jr. (RJ), Rashawn Slater, and Rylan Slater. RJ played football for the Air Force Academy in 2014-2018.

Professional career
Slater was not selected in the 1992 NBA Draft and played professionally in Spain for two years before being signed by the Denver Nuggets in 1994.

Slater played in eight NBA seasons for the Nuggets, Portland Trail Blazers, Dallas Mavericks, Toronto Raptors, Minnesota Timberwolves, New Jersey Nets and Atlanta Hawks from 1994–1999 and 2000–2003. Over the course of his NBA career, Slater played in 259 games and scored a total of 1,450 points and averaged 5.6 points and 3.0 rebounds per game. His best NBA season came during the 1997–98 NBA season as a member of the Raptors, where he appeared in 78 games and averaged 8.0 points, 3.9 rebounds, 0.9 assists, 0.6 steals and 0.4 blocks in 21.3 minutes per game, all career bests except for blocks. As a result, more than 43 percent of his NBA career scoring and more than 30 percent of his NBA career games played totals came during that season.

References

External links
Historical Player Profile at NBA.com

1970 births
Living people
20th-century African-American sportspeople
21st-century African-American sportspeople
African-American basketball players
American expatriate basketball people in Canada
American expatriate basketball people in Italy
American expatriate basketball people in Spain
American expatriate basketball people in Turkey
American men's basketball players
Atlanta Hawks players
Baloncesto Málaga players
Basket Livorno players
Basketball players from Houston
CB Girona players
CB Peñas Huesca players
CBA All-Star Game players
Chicago Rockers players
Dallas Mavericks players
Denver Nuggets players
La Crosse Bobcats players
Liga ACB players
Minnesota Timberwolves players
Montecatiniterme Basketball players
New Jersey Nets players
Portland Trail Blazers players
Power forwards (basketball)
Real Betis Baloncesto players
Toronto Raptors players
Ülker G.S.K. basketball players
Undrafted National Basketball Association players
Vancouver Grizzlies expansion draft picks
Wyoming Cowboys basketball players